The following lists events that happened during 2002 in Republic of Albania.

Incumbents 
 President: Rexhep Meidani (until 24 July), Alfred Moisiu (starting 24 July)
 Prime Minister: Ilir Meta (until 22 February), Pandeli Majko (22 February - 31 July), Fatos Nano (starting 31 July)

Events

January 
 Meta resigns as prime minister after failing to resolve party feud.

February 
 Pandeli Majko becomes premier and forms new government as rival factions in Socialist Party pledge to end infighting.

August  
 Fatos Nano becomes prime minister after the ruling Socialist Party decides to merge the roles of premier and party chairman. It is Nano's fourth time as premier.

Deaths 
 12 August - Teodor Keko, Albanian writer, journalist and politician

References 

 
Years of the 21st century in Albania
2000s in Albania